Stokksnes is a headland on the southeastern Icelandic coast, near Hofn and Hornafjördur. Stokksnes is located south of Kastarárfjall mountain, and includes Vestrahorn mountain, which was featured in the Bollywood film Dilwale. The H-3 Radar Station Stokksnes is located at the tip of the headland. The Iceland Air Defence System uses the station to monitor Iceland's airspace.

References

Headlands of Iceland
Black sand beaches